Ceroprepes ophthalmicella is a species of snout moth in the genus Ceroprepes. It was described by Hugo Theodor Christoph in 1881 and is known from the Russian Far East, Japan, Korea, China and Taiwan.

The wingspan is 20–27 mm.

References

Moths described in 1881
Phycitinae
Moths of Japan